Myrichthys paleracio, the whitenose snake eel, is a species of Myrichthys that was discovered on 2012 in the Philippines.

References

External links

paleracio
Fish of the Philippines
Fish described in 2012